Ro-26, originally named Submarine No. 45, was an Imperial Japanese Navy Kaichū-Type submarine, the lead unit of the Kaichū IV subclass. She was in commission from 1923 to 1938 and from 1939 to 1940.

Design and description
The submarines of the Kaichu IV sub-class were an improved version of the preceding Kaichu III subclass, slightly larger, with heavier torpedoes, and with the deck gun mounted forward of the conning tower instead of aft of it. They displaced  surfaced and  submerged.

For surface running, the submarines were powered by two  Sulzer Mark II diesel engines, each driving one propeller shaft. When submerged each propeller was driven by a  electric motor. They could reach  on the surface and  underwater.

The submarines were armed with four internal bow  torpedo tubes and carried a total of eight torpedoes. They were also armed with a single  deck gun.

Construction and commissioning

Ro-26 was laid down as Submarine No. 45 on 10 March 1921 by the Sasebo Naval Arsenal at Sasebo, Japan. Launched on 18 October 1921, she was completed and commissioned on 25 January 1923, the lead unit of the Kaichū IV subclass.

Service history

Upon commissioning, Submarine No. 45 was attached to the Kure Naval District, and on 15 December 1923, she was assigned to Submarine Division 14 and to the Kure Defense Division. On 1 April 1924, Submarine Division 14 was reassigned to Submarine Squadron 2 in the 2nd Fleet.

On 16 May 1924 Submarine No. 45′s diving rudders failed while she was conducting a practice attack. Her crew managed to bring her to the surface, and she suffered no casualties.

On 1 November 1924, Submarine No. 45 was renamed Ro-26. Submarine Division 14 was reassigned to the Kure Naval District on 1 August 1925, and on 18 August 1925 began duty with the Kure Defense Division. This lasted until 1 December 1925, when the division returned to Submarine Squadron 2 in the 2nd Fleet.

On 1 December 1926, Submarine Division 14 was reassigned to the Kure Naval District, in which it remained until 1933. In the years that followed, the division had duty in the Kure Defense Division from 10 December 1928 to 1 December 1930, and Ro-26 underwent a refit in 1932. Ro-26 again served in the Kure Defense Division from 1 October 1932 to 1 February 1933. and was assigned directly to the Kure Naval District from 15 November 1933 to 15 November 1935, then returned to Submarine Division 14. She was decommissioned on 1 December 1938 and placed in Fourth Reserve in the Kure Naval District, then recommissioned on 1 May 1939 and assigned directly to the district.

Ro-26 was decommissioned and stricken from the Navy list on 1 April 1940. She served subsequently as the training hulk Heisan No. 6 at the submarine school at Kure, Japan. She was sold for scrap after World War II; scrapping began at Kanagawa, Japan, in 1947 and was completed in April 1948.

Notes

References
, History of Pacific War Vol.17 I-Gō Submarines, Gakken (Japan), January 1998, 
Rekishi Gunzō, History of Pacific War Extra, "Perfect guide, The submarines of the Imperial Japanese Forces", Gakken (Japan), March 2005, 
The Maru Special, Japanese Naval Vessels No.43 Japanese Submarines III, Ushio Shobō (Japan), September 1980, Book code 68343-44
The Maru Special, Japanese Naval Vessels No.132 Japanese Submarines I "Revised edition", Ushio Shobō (Japan), February 1988, Book code 68344-36
The Maru Special, Japanese Naval Vessels No.133 Japanese Submarines II "Revised edition", Ushio Shobō (Japan), March 1988, Book code 68344-37
The Maru Special, Japanese Naval Vessels No.135 Japanese Submarines IV, Ushio Shobō (Japan), May 1988, Book code 68344-39

Ro-26-class submarines
Kaichū type submarines
Ships built by Sasebo Naval Arsenal
1921 ships
Maritime incidents in 1924